Feeding the Monkies at Ma Maison is an album by Frank Zappa, which was released posthumously in 2011 by The Zappa Family Trust on Zappa Records.

History 
Executed by Frank Zappa on his Synclavier at the Utility Muffin Research Kitchen circa 1986, it was originally intended as a vinyl release. It appears to be the missing link between Jazz from Hell (1986) and Civilization, Phaze III (1994). Of the track "Worms from Hell" 28 seconds first appeared as opening title music for the Video from Hell VHS release in 1987.

Track listing 
All songs written, composed and arranged by Frank Zappa.

Personnel 
 Frank Zappa – synclavier
 Moon Zappa – vocals

References

External links 
 

Frank Zappa albums
2011 albums
Albums published posthumously